Anton Wilhelm Amo or Anthony William Amo (c. 1703 – c. 1759) was an African philosopher originally from what is now Ghana. Amo was a professor at the universities of Halle and Jena in Germany after studying there. He was brought to Germany by the Dutch West India Company in 1707 and was presented as a gift to Dukes Augustus William and Ludwig Rudolf of Brunswick-Wolfenbüttel, being treated as a member of the family by their father Anthony Ulrich, Duke of Brunswick-Wolfenbüttel. Amo was the first African-born person known to have attended a European university. In 2020, Oxford University Press published a translation (into English) of his Latin works from the early 1730s.

Early life and education

Amo was a Nzema (an Akan people). He was born in Axim in the Western region of present-day Ghana, but at the age of about four he was moved to Amsterdam by the Dutch West India Company. Some accounts say that he was enslaved, others that he was sent to Amsterdam by a preacher working in Ghana. Ultimately, it is unknown.      

On 29 July 1708, Amo was baptised (and in 1721 confirmed) in the palace's chapel of Salzdahlum near Wolfenbüttel. In 1721 and 1725 he is mentioned as a servant to the Duke's family.

He went on to the University of Halle, whose Law School he entered in 1727. He finished his preliminary studies within two years, titling his thesis Dissertatio Inauguralis de Jure Maurorum in Europa (1729). This manuscript on The Rights of Moors in Europe is lost, but a summary was published in his university's Annals (1730). For his further studies Amo moved to the University of Wittenberg, studying logic, metaphysics, physiology, astronomy, history, law, theology, politics, and medicine, and mastered six languages (English, French, Dutch, Latin, Greek, and German). His medical education in particular was to play a central role in much of his later philosophical thought.

He gained his doctorate in philosophy at Wittenberg in 1734; his thesis (published as On the Absence of Sensation in the Human Mind and its Presence in our Organic and Living Body) argued in favour of a broadly dualist account of the person.  Specifically, he argues that it is correct to talk of a mind and a body, but that it is the body rather than the mind that perceives and feels. One example of an argument that Amo uses to show that it is the body, and not the mind, which senses goes as follows: 

Whatever feels, lives; whatever lives, depends on nourishment; whatever lives and depends on nourishment grows; whatever is of this nature is in the end resolved into its basic principles; whatever comes to be resolved into its basic principles is a complex; every complex has its constituent parts; whatever this is true of is a divisible body.  If therefore the human mind feels, it follows that it is a divisible body.
(On the Ἀπάθεια (Apatheia) of the Human Mind 2.1)

Because (on Amo's account) the human mind is by definition immaterial and not a divisible body (On the Ἀπάθεια (Apatheia) of the Human Mind 1.3), it therefore cannot be the case that the mind itself senses.

Philosophical career and later life
Amo returned to the University of Halle to lecture in philosophy under his preferred name of Antonius Guilelmus Amo Afer. In 1736 he was made a professor.  From his lectures, he produced his second major work in 1738, Treatise on the Art of Philosophising Soberly and Accurately, in which he developed an empiricist epistemology very close to but distinct from that of philosophers such as John Locke and David Hume.  In it he also examined and criticised faults such as intellectual dishonesty, dogmatism, and prejudice.

In 1740, Amo took up a post in philosophy at the University of Jena, but while there he experienced a number of changes for the worse.  The Duke of Brunswick-Wolfenbüttel had died in 1735, leaving him without his long-standing patron and protector.  That coincided with social changes in Germany, which was becoming intellectually and morally narrower and less liberal.  Those who argued against the secularisation of education (and against the rights of Africans in Europe) were regaining their ascendancy over those who campaigned for greater academic and social freedom, such as Christian Wolff.

Amo was subjected to an unpleasant campaign by some of his enemies, including a public lampoon staged at a theatre in Halle. He finally decided to return to the land of his birth.  He set sail on a Dutch West India Company ship to Ghana via Guinea, arriving in about 1747; his  father and a sister were still living there. His life from then on becomes more obscure.  According to at least one report, he was taken to a Dutch fortress, Fort San Sebastian in Shama, in the 1750s, possibly to prevent him sowing dissent amongst the people.  The exact date, place, and manner of his death are unknown, though he probably died in about 1759 at the fort in Shama in Ghana.

Legacy
Amo is cited in Abbé Grégoire's De la littérature des nègres (1808).

In August 2020, in a context of "decolonization" of place names following the murder of George Floyd, the German capital Berlin decided to rename its Mohrenstraße to "Anton-Wilhelm-Amo-Straße" in his honour.

On 10 October 2020, Google celebrated him with a Google Doodle.

Works 
 Dissertatio inauguralis de iure maurorum in Europa, 1729 (lost).
 Dissertatio inauguralis de humanae mentis apatheia, Wittenberg, 1734.
 Disputatio philosophica continens ideam distinctam eorum quae competunt vel menti vel corpori nostro vivo et organico, Wittenberg, 1734 (Ph.D. thesis).
 Tractatus de arte sobrie et accurate philosophandi, 1738.

References

Further reading
 
 
 
 
 
 
 
 Herbjørnsrud, Dag  (2017) The African Enlightenment, edited by Sam Dresser, AEON, 13 December 2017
 
 
 
 Smith, Justin E. H. (2013). "The Enlightenment’s ‘Race’ Problem, and Ours"

External links
 An extensive archive of materials by and about Amo can be found at TheAmoproject.org.
 The Latin original of Amo's Dissertatio inauguralis de humanae mentis apatheia, Wittenberg (On the Impassivity of the Human Mind), 1734 (Berlin State Library)
 Amo scholar Dwight Lewis provides a concise account of Amo's life and work which can be found on the American Philosophical Association blog: APA Online.
The Oxford University Press translation and biography, by Stephen Menn and Just EH Smith:

1703 births
1759 deaths
18th-century Ghanaian people
18th-century Latin-language writers
18th-century philosophers
Academic staff of the University of Halle
Academic staff of the University of Jena
German people of Ghanaian descent
German philosophers
Ghanaian male writers
Ghanaian philosophers
Ghanaian writers
Nobility of Brunswick-Lüneburg
People from Western Region (Ghana)
University of Halle alumni
University of Helmstedt alumni
University of Wittenberg alumni